Vishal Gandhi is an Indian television actor known for playing Kabir Singh Rathod in popular Balaji Telefilms' show Pyaar Kii Ye Ek Kahaani and as grey shaded character Mihir Sukhadia in  Tamanna on Star Plus in 2016. and as Paras Patel in Gujarati political thriller series titled Kshadyantra on ShemarooME.
He is currently seen as Tej Ahlawat in Zee TV's drama series Meet: Badlegi Duniya Ki Reet.

Early life and career
Vishal Gandhi was born in Gujarat. He has a graduate degree from National College, Ahmedabad. He started his career as a child actor in Ekka Raja Rani (1994). He went on to play lead roles in Bandhan Saat Janamon Ka, Ek Doosre Se Karte Hain Pyaar Hum,  Tamanna, parallel lead in Pyaar Kii Ye Ek Kahaani and several important characters in various shows.

Television

Web series

Music videos

References

External links
 

Living people
Indian male television actors
Year of birth missing (living people)